Telefoncular FC was an association football club which was founded by Englishmen who were employed building the İstanbul Telephone Company in Istanbul in Turkey in 1912. It was closed by the Ottoman Government due to the outbreak of World War I.

Honours
Istanbul Football League:
6th: 1913–1914

See also
List of Turkish Sports Clubs by Foundation Dates

References

External links
 Telefoncular. Türk Futbol Tarihi vol.1. page(25). (June 1992) Türkiye Futbol Federasyonu Yayınları.

Defunct football clubs in Turkey
Association football clubs established in 1912
Sport in Istanbul
Association football clubs disestablished in 1914
1912 establishments in the Ottoman Empire
1914 disestablishments in the Ottoman Empire